Paul Fournier (26 November 1853, Calais – 14 May 1935, Paris) was a French legal historian. He was a member of the Institut de France.

Biography 
Born in Calais, Paul Fournier obtained a law degree before studying the history of institutions at the École Nationale des Chartes, of which he was graduated in 1879 with a thesis on Officialités au Moyen Âge (Paris, 1880).

Agrégé in 1881, he was appointed professor or Roman law at the University of Grenoble where he would stay thirty three years, becoming dean of the faculty in 1904. He was appointed to the University of Paris in 1914.

In 1911 he was elected a member of the Académie des inscriptions et belles-lettres.

He is best known as a specialist in canon law.

Selected works 
1886: Un adversaire inconnu de saint Bernard et de Pierre Lombard
1887: La questiondes fausses décrétales  
1894: Une collection canonique italienne du commencement du XIIe siècle
1895: La constitution de Léon XIII sur les églises unies d'Orient
1901: Étude sur les pénitentiels
1904: Un curé lorrain au XVIIIe siècle

Sources 
 Bibliothèque de l'École des chartes, 1936, vol. 97, (p. 228–232)

External links 
 Paul Fournier et l'histoire de l'Église de France

Members of the Académie des Inscriptions et Belles-Lettres
École Nationale des Chartes alumni
19th-century French historians
20th-century French historians
Legal historians
French medievalists
French palaeographers
1853 births
People from Calais
1935 deaths
Corresponding Fellows of the Medieval Academy of America